Midland Adventist Academy is a private, coeducational, K-12 grade school located in Shawnee, Kansas.
It is a part of the Seventh-day Adventist education system, the world's second largest Christian school system.

Midland Adventist Academy

Academics
Midland is part of the greater Adventist education system operated by the Seventh-day Adventist Church.  It is under the direction of the Office of Education of the North American Division of Seventh-day Adventists, which began oversight of elementary and secondary education in 1872.

Spiritual aspects
All students take religion classes each year that they are enrolled. These classes cover topics in biblical history and Christian and denominational doctrines. Instructors in other disciplines also begin each class period with prayer or a short devotional though, Weekly, the entire student body gathers together in the auditorium for an hour-long chapel service.
Outside the classrooms there is year-round spiritually oriented programming that relies on student involvement.

School dynamics
The school's primary goal is to provide education within a Christ-centered environment as to prepare its students for service to God and humanity. There are many ways in which students can get involved with the community through student community service programs.

Local community programs
Fall Community Clean-up
Disaster Outreach
Nursing Home Visits
Soup Kitchen
Blood Drives

International community programs
Mission Trips

High school sports
Boys' Basketball
Girls' Basketball
Girls' Volleyball
Boys' Soccer
Gymnastics team, Midland AcroClub
Cross Country

See also

List of Seventh-day Adventist secondary schools

References

External links

Schools in Johnson County, Kansas
Private high schools in Kansas
Adventist secondary schools in the United States
1961 establishments in Kansas